Bofete is a municipality in the state of São Paulo in Brazil. The population is 11,921 (2020 est.) in an area of 654 km². The elevation is 576 m.

With a mountainous relief and a mild subtropical highland climate, the city is known for its mountain known as "O Gigante Adormecido" (The Sleeping Giant). The economy of the municipality is based on silviculture, orange cultivation, agriculture and tourism.

Gallery

References

Municipalities in São Paulo (state)